Stephanie McCurry is an American historian and a professor of history at Columbia University. Her book Confederate Reckoning: Power and Politics in the Civil War was a finalist for the Pulitzer Prize for History in 2011.

Life
She was born in Belfast.  She graduated from University of Western Ontario, received her MA from the University of Rochester, and Ph.D. from the Binghamton University. She spent nine years on the faculty of the University of California in San Diego before moving to Northwestern University in 1998 and the University of Pennsylvania in 2003. In 2015, she moved again this time to replace Eric Foner on the faculty at Columbia University.

Works

References

External links

Living people
University of Western Ontario alumni
Columbia University faculty
British emigrants to the United States
University of Rochester alumni
Binghamton University alumni
Year of birth missing (living people)